Camden, New Jersey is located on the Delaware River in the Delaware Valley/Philadelphia metropolitan area in the US. At , a tower of the Benjamin Franklin Bridge is the tallest structure in the city. Several buildings of the Victor Talking Machine Company (which became part of RCA Victor in 1929) dot the city's skyline, which also includes late 20th century residential high-rises.

Tallest buildings

Proposed

In May 2013 the New Jersey Economic Development Authority announced that it would seek developers for the site of the demolished Riverfront State Prison just north of the Central Waterfront and the Benjamin Franklin Bridge in Cooper Point. In September 2013 Waterfront Renaissance Associates announced that it proposed to a develop a 2.3-million-square-foot commercial complex on   called the Riverfront World Trade Center. The project would be built in four phases, the first of which would be a promenade along the Delaware River.The plan calls for two 22-story and two 18-story buildings.

The  Skyview Tower, a combination gyro tower and moored balloon, in the city's entertainment district on the Camden Waterfront was expected to open in 2015. The structure is three rod towers joined at intervals by circular hoops Propelled by a winch,  lightweight carriage disguised within the balloon envelope ascends the tower. The gondola beneath the balloon acts as floating circular walkway for a maximum of 40 passengers.

Called Camden Towers it all include an 18-story building the waterfront. Construction began in 2017.

See also
 National Register of Historic Places listings in Camden County, New Jersey
 List of tallest buildings in New Jersey
List of tallest buildings in Philadelphia

References

External links 
Emporis Camden
SkyscraperPage Camden

Camden
Towers in New Jersey
History of Camden, New Jersey
Tourist attractions in Camden County, New Jersey
Architecture in New Jersey
Camden